NGC 358 is a very small open cluster of four stars in the constellation of Cassiopeia. It was originally thought to be an unrelated asterism, but two of the members were found to have a similar distance of roughly 1700 light years, although the other two do not have well-constrained distances, so its exact nature is uncertain.

The asterism was discovered on February 4, 1865 by the German-Danish astronomer Heinrich Louis d'Arrest.

Individual Objects

References

External links 
 DSS Images for NGC 300 through NGC 399
 SEDS
 VizieR-Katalog
 VizieR Umgebungssuche

0358
Cassiopeia (constellation)
18650604